Carlos Antonio Giménez (born January 17, 1954) is a Cuban-born American politician and retired firefighter serving as the U.S. representative for . A Republican, he served as mayor of Miami-Dade County from 2011 to 2020. He served as a Miami-Dade County Commissioner from 2003 to 2011, and was the fire chief of the City of Miami Fire Department.

Giménez supported Hillary Clinton in the 2016 presidential election. In 2020, he ran as a supporter of President Donald Trump and was endorsed by him. He was redistricted to the 28th district in 2022.

Giménez serves as one of the Republican assistant whips under Steve Scalise.

Early life and education
Giménez was born in Havana, Cuba, in 1954 to ranchers from the Oriente province. In 1960, his family immigrated to the U.S. in the wake of the Cuban Revolution, settling in what became Miami's Little Havana.

Giménez attended Columbus High School near Miami and earned a bachelor's degree in public administration from Barry University. In 1993, he completed the Program for Senior Executives in State and Local Government at Harvard University's John F. Kennedy School of Government.

Career 
Giménez joined the City of Miami Fire Department as a firefighter in 1975. He was appointed fire chief in 1991, the City of Miami's first Cuban-American fire chief, serving until 2000.

Giménez is a former member of the International City Managers Association, the International Association of Fire Chiefs, the National Fire Protection Association, the Florida Fire Chiefs, and the Fire Officers Association of Miami-Dade. He also served on the Federal Emergency Management Agency Urban Search and Rescue Advisory Committee and as the Chair of the Legal Issues Subcommittee.

City manager and county commissioner 

From May 2000 to January 2003, Giménez served as city manager of Miami proper, appointed by then mayor Joe Carollo, to replace incumbent Donald Warshaw. In 2004, he was elected as a Miami-Dade County Commissioner for the county's 7th district, beating former Mayor of Miami Xavier Suarez. His district included Miami proper, the Village of Key Biscayne, Coral Gables, South Miami, Kendall, and Pinecrest.

Mayorship 

Giménez was elected mayor of the metropolitan government of Miami-Dade County, Florida on June 28, 2011, in the 2011 Miami-Dade County mayoral special election. Incumbent mayor Carlos Alvarez had been recalled in one of the largest recall elections of a municipal official in U.S. history. No candidate got over 50% of the popular vote in the first round, so a runoff election was held. Giménez won the runoff with 51% of the vote to Julio Robaina's 49%.

During his 2011 campaign, Giménez promised that if elected, he would cut his own salary. After he was elected, he kept this promise, cutting his own salary and benefits by 50%.

Giménez was reelected in the 2012 Miami-Dade County mayoral election with 54% of the vote against multiple candidates, and in 2016 with 56% of the vote against school board member Raquel Regalado.

Cooperation with ICE 
In 2017, President Donald Trump signed an executive order targeting "sanctuary" jurisdictions that limited or refused to cooperate with federal immigration authorities, ordering a review of their access to federal funding. Miami-Dade received a letter from the administration that the county had been flagged as a sanctuary jurisdiction. Giménez then ordered the director of his corrections department to begin honoring all requests by Immigration and Customs Enforcement (ICE). The Miami Dade County Board of Commissioners formally codified his order by a 9 to 3 vote. The Department of Justice later confirmed the county was no longer flagged as a sanctuary jurisdiction. In December 2018, the Florida Third District Court of Appeal dismissed a lawsuit filed in state court challenging the county's detention policy.

Election administration 
In the lead-up to the 2020 election, which took place during the COVID-19 pandemic, Giménez limited the number of ballot drop locations. His office sent mail-in ballots to voters later than required by state law.

Before the 2020 election, the Miami Heat sought to make AmericanAirlines Arena the early voting site for downtown Miami. In the wake of the murder of George Floyd, the NBA had sought to "channel demands for social justice into a voting drive by turning arenas into polling places." The city was close to signing an agreement with the Heat that included a ban on political advertising in the arena while voting was underway. Giménez intervened and the city ultimately selected the Phillip and Patricia Frost Museum of Science, a previous longtime polling location, as Miami's early voting location, citing its proximity to a Metromover station as well as access to ground-level parking. The Frost Museum site was smaller than the arena and elections staff had not mentioned it on a draft list of 33 early voting sites that the staff worked on to prepare safe voting during a pandemic.

U.S. House of Representatives

Elections

2020 

In January 2020, Giménez announced his candidacy for the Republican nomination in the 2020 U.S. House election for Florida's 26th congressional district. He was term-limited from running again as mayor. In the 2016 presidential election, Giménez endorsed Hillary Clinton. In 2020, he said that he had "made a mistake" in supporting Clinton. Having previously distanced himself from Trump, Giménez ran as a pro-Trump Republican in 2020. He ran on a platform of repealing the Affordable Care Act (Obamacare) and opposing a carbon tax. Trump endorsed Giménez in January 2020. On August 18, 2020, Giménez won the Republican primary election, defeating Omar Blanco with 59.9% of the vote. In the general election, he defeated incumbent Democrat Debbie Mucarsel-Powell. He was likely aided by Trump's strong showing in Miami-Dade County: he carried the 26th district with 53% of the vote after losing it by 16 percentage points four years earlier.

Tenure 
In late 2020, Giménez was a member of Freedom Force, a group of incoming Republican House members who "say they're fighting against socialism in America". On February 4, 2021, he joined 10 other House Republicans voting with all voting Democrats to strip Marjorie Taylor Greene of her House Education and Labor Committee, and House Budget Committee assignments in response to conspiratorial and violent statements she had made.

In March 2021, Giménez voted against the American Rescue Plan Act of 2021.

Committee assignments 
 Committee on Transportation and Infrastructure
 Subcommittee on Economic Development, Public Buildings and Emergency Management
 Subcommittee on Highways and Transit
 Subcommittee on Aviation
 Committee on Homeland Security
 Subcommittee on Transportation and Maritime Security (Ranking Member)
 Committee on Science, Space, and Technology
 Subcommittee on Energy
 Subcommittee on Environment

Source

Caucus memberships 
 Republican Main Street Partnership
 Republican Governance Group

Political positions

2020 presidential election 
After Joe Biden won the 2020 election and Trump refused to concede while making false claims of fraud, Giménez defended Trump and said he should not concede. He later voted against certification of Arizona's and Pennsylvania's electoral votes. Giménez voted against the second impeachment of Donald Trump on January 13, 2021.

On May 19, 2021, Giménez was one of 35 Republicans who joined all Democrats in voting to approve legislation to establish the January 6 commission meant to investigate the storming of the U.S. Capitol.

LGBT rights 
In 2021, Giménez was among the House Republicans to sponsor the Fairness for All Act, the Republican proposed alternative to the Equality Act. The bill would prohibit discrimination on the basis of sex, sexual orientation, and gender identity, and protect the free exercise of religion. While he was Miami-Dade mayor, Gimenez announced his support for the Supreme Court ruling Obergefell v. Hodges, which held that same-sex marriage bans violate the constitution.

In 2021, Giménez was one of 29 Republicans to vote to reauthorize the Violence Against Women Act. This bill expanded legal protections for transgender people, and contained provisions allowing transgender women to use women's shelters and serve time in prisons matching their gender identity.

On July 19, 2022, Giménez and 46 other Republican representatives voted for the Respect for Marriage Act, which would codify the right to same-sex marriage in federal law.

Gun rights 
In March 2021, Giménez was one of eight Republicans to join the House majority in passing the Bipartisan Background Checks Act of 2021.

Electoral history

Personal life

Giménez is married to Lourdes Portela, with whom he has three children. Giménez is Roman Catholic.

See also
List of Hispanic and Latino Americans in the United States Congress
Hispanic and Latino conservatism in the United States

References

External links
Representative Carlos Giménez official U.S. House website
 Campaign website
 
 

|-

|-

 

|-

 -->

1954 births
American anti-communists
American fire chiefs
American Roman Catholics
American politicians of Cuban descent
Barry University alumni
Catholics from Florida
California Republicans
Candidates in the 2020 United States elections
County commissioners in Florida
Cuban anti-communists
Cuban emigrants to the United States
Exiles of the Cuban Revolution in the United States
Hispanic and Latino American members of the United States Congress
Harvard Kennedy School alumni
Living people
Mayors of Miami-Dade County, Florida
Naturalized citizens of the United States
Republican Party members of the United States House of Representatives from Florida
Christopher Columbus High School (Miami-Dade County, Florida) alumni
Latino conservatism in the United States